The Lazzaretto Vecchio ("Old Lazaret"), formerly known as  ("Holy Mary of Nazareth"), is an island of the Venetian Lagoon, northern Italy, located near the Lido of Venice. Between 1403 and 1630 it housed a hospital which cared for people during the plague epidemics and as a leper colony, giving rise to the English words lazaret and lazaretto. It was later used, as were other islands, as a military post. It covers an area  large.

Since 2004 archaeologists have unearthed more than 1500 skeletons of plague victims buried here between the 15th and 17th centuries. These have been found in individual as well as in mass graves. The remains of thousands more are expected still to be found on the small island as the death-toll reportedly reached 500 per day in the 16th century.

Gallery

See also

 Lazaretto
 Leper Colony

References

Islands of the Venetian Lagoon
Leper colonies
Quarantine facilities in Italy
Defunct hospitals in Italy